The Western Wall is a sacred Jewish pilgrimage site in Jerusalem.

Western Wall may also refer to:

 Western Wall: The Tucson Sessions, a 1999 album by Linda Ronstadt and Emmylou Harris
 Western Wall Tunnel, a tunnel along the base of the Western Wall
 Little Western Wall, a Jewish religious site in Jerusalem
 Siegfried Line (German: Westwall), a German defensive line along the Franco-German border
 A wall of earth built to contain lava flows at the Fagradalsfjall volcanic eruption in Iceland